Schizophyllum is a genus of fungi in the family Schizophyllaceae. The widespread genus contains six wood-rotting species.

References

External links
Schizophyllum: perhaps the world's most widespread fungus

Schizophyllaceae
Agaricales genera